Stagmomantis is a genus consisting of 21 species of mantises native to the Americas.

Species

S. californica
S. carolina
S. coerulans
S. colorata
S. costalis
S. domingensis
S. floridensis
S. fraterna
S. gracilipes
S. hebardi
S. limbata
S. marginata
S. maya
S. montana
S. nahua
S. pagana
S. parvidentata
S. theophila
S. tolteca
S. venusta
S. vicina

See also

List of mantis genera and species

References

Stagmomantinae
Mantodea genera
Mantodea of North America
Mantodea of South America
Taxa named by Henri Louis Frédéric de Saussure